Samir Moussaoui (born 15 May 1975 in Bordj Bou-Azzéridj) is an Algerian long-distance runner who specializes in the 5000 and 10,000 metres.

He has reached two Olympic finals, finishing 16th in 10,000 metres at the 2000 Summer Olympics and 14th in 5000 metres at the 2004 Summer Olympics. He also won a bronze medal in 5000 m at the 2005 Islamic Solidarity Games.

His personal best times are 13:18.99 minutes and 28:01.34 minutes on the two distances.

External links

1975 births
Living people
Algerian male long-distance runners
Athletes (track and field) at the 2000 Summer Olympics
Athletes (track and field) at the 2004 Summer Olympics
Olympic athletes of Algeria
Islamic Solidarity Games competitors for Algeria
21st-century Algerian people
20th-century Algerian people